This is a complete list of ice hockey players who have been drafted in the National Hockey League Entry Draft by the Winnipeg Jets. It includes every player who was drafted, regardless of whether they played for the team.

Key
 Played at least one game with the Jets.
 Spent entire NHL career with the Jets.

Draft picks
Statistics are complete as of the 2021–22 NHL season and show each player's career regular season totals in the NHL.  Wins, losses, overtime losses, goals against average and save percentage apply to goaltenders and are used only for players at that position.

See also
List of Atlanta Thrashers draft picks

References

External links
 Winnipeg Jets' official website

 
Draft
Winnipeg Jets